Pseudochromis jamesi the Spot-tailed dottyback, is a species of ray-finned fish from the  Pacific Ocean, which is a member of the family Pseudochromidae.

References

jamesi
Taxa named by Leonard Peter Schultz
Fish described in 1943